Coelophysis?  kayentakatae is an extinct species of neotheropod dinosaur that lived approximately 200 - 196 million years ago during the early part of the Jurassic Period in what is now the southwestern United States. While originally assigned to the genus Syntarsus as Syntarsus kayentakatae, that genus name was found to be preoccupied by a Colydiine beetle, so it was moved to the genus Megapnosaurus as Megapnosaurus kayentakatae. Later it was moved again to Coelophysis, however the species still possesses no definite genus assignment.

Discovery
The holotype of C.? kayentakatae (MNA V2623) was recovered in the Silty Facies Member of the Kayenta Formation in Arizona. This material was collected in 1977 from carbonaceous sandstone deposited during the Sinemurian and Pliensbachian stages of the Jurassic period. Specimen UCMP V128659 was discovered in 1982 and referred to Megapnosaurus kayentakatae by Rowe (1989), as a subadult gracile individual and later, Tykoski (2005) agreed. Gay (2010) described the specimen as the new tetanurine taxon Kayentavenator elysiae, but Mortimer (2010) pointed out that there was no published evidence that Kayentavenator is the same taxon as M. kayentakatae.

The species epithet of C.? kayentakatae refers to Dr. Kathleen Smith, nicknamed "Kayenta Kay" for her extensive work in the Kayenta Formation, which included the discovery of the type specimen of this species.

Description
 
It had two small, parallel crests which may demonstrate an evolutionary step toward later and larger neotheropods, such as the more advanced and larger Dilophosaurus. Both possess a "weak joint" between the premaxillary and the maxillary bones, creating a hooked premaxillary jaw.

Specimen UCMP V128659 was discovered in 1982 and referred to Syntarsus kayentakatae by Rowe in 1989 as a subadult gracile individual and Tykoski (2005) later agreed. Gay (2010) classified the specimen as tetanurine Kayentavenator elysiae. Mortimer (2010) pointed out that there was no published evidence to support Kayentavenator being the same as kayentakatae except for in Ezcurra (2012) based on an unpublished analysis.

According to Tykoski and Rowe (2004) "Coelophysis" kayentakatae can be distinguished based on the following characteristics:

the presence of nasal crests on the skull
 the frontal bones on the skull are separated by a midline anterior extension of the parietal bones

Furthermore, they list a transverse groove on the anterior astragalar surface, as an additional autapomorphy, however, it's also present in Coelophysis bauri and the Shake-n-Bake coelophysid (Tykoski, 2005).

Classification
It was originally included in the genus Syntarsus along with type species Syntarsus rhodesiensis, but the name is preoccupied by a junior synonym of beetle genus Cerchanotus. The dinosaur genus was renamed Megapnosaurus in 2001. Both species have sometimes been reclassified as Coelophysis species.

Marsh and Rowe (2020) retain the generic name Syntarsus for both QG 1 and MNA V2623, and the respective specimens assigned to these taxa, as opposed to Coelophysis or Megapnosaurus, due to systematic relationships within Coelophysoidea in flux. As such, congenericity or the need for Megapnosaurus would not be supported if Coelophysis bauri, Syntarsus rhodesiensis, and Syntarsus kayentakatae do not form respective clades, as evidenced by their phylogenetic analyses. 

Ezcurra et al. (2021) found that "Syntarsus" kayentakatae was not closely related to Coelophysis bauri or to Megapnosaurus rhodesiensis.

Paleoecology
The Kayenta Formation is part of the Glen Canyon Group that includes formations not only in northern Arizona but also parts of southeastern Utah, western Colorado, and northwestern New Mexico. The formation was primarily deposited by rivers, with the silty facies created by the slower, more sluggish part of the river system. A definitive radiometric dating of this formation has not yet been made, and the available stratigraphic correlation has been based on a combination of radiometric dates from vertebrate fossils, magnetostratigraphy and pollen evidence.

 

During the Early Jurassic period, the land that is now the Kayenta Formation experienced rainy summers and dry winters. By the Middle Jurassic period it was being encroached upon from the north by a sandy dune field that would become the Navajo Sandstone. The animals here were adapted to a seasonal climate and abundant water could be found in streams, ponds and lakes. ‘‘C.’’? kayentakatae shared its paleoenvironment with other dinosaurs, such as several theropods including Dilophosaurus, Kayentavenator, the "Shake-N-Bake" theropod, the basal sauropodomorph Sarahsaurus, heterodontosaurids, and the armored dinosaurs Scelidosaurus and Scutellosaurus. The Kayenta Formation has produced the remains of three coelophysoid taxa of different body size, representing the most diverse ceratosaur fauna yet known. The formation has also yielded a small but growing assemblage of organisms. Vertebrates present in the Kayenta Formation at the time of ‘‘C.’’? kayentakatae included hybodont sharks, indeterminate bony fish, lungfish, salamanders, the frog Prosalirus, the caecilian Eocaecilia, the turtle Kayentachelys, a sphenodontian reptile, various lizards, and the pterosaur Rhamphinion. Also present were the synapsids Dinnebitodon, Kayentatherium, Oligokyphus, morganucodontans,  the possible early true mammal Dinnetherium, and a haramiyid mammal. Several early crocodylomorphs were also present, including Calsoyasuchus, Eopneumatosuchus, Kayentasuchus, and Protosuchus. Vertebrate trace fossils from this area include coprolites and the tracks of therapsids, lizard-like animals, and dinosaurs. Non-vertebrates in this ecosystem included microbial or "algal" limestone, freshwater bivalves, freshwater mussels and snails, and ostracods. The plant life known from this area included trees that became preserved as petrified wood.

Taphonomy
The holotype (MNA V2623) of ‘‘C.’’? kayentakatae came to rest on its left side and was partially buried. This served to stabilize the bones on the left side of the skull; however, the right side of the skull was likely exposed to water currents as it began to decompose. Some of the loosely connected bones on this side drifted out of place before the entire skull was finally buried. Later, the great weight of overlying sediment served to distort the specimen.

References

Coelophysoids
Early Jurassic dinosaurs of North America
Fossil taxa described in 1989
Paleontology in Arizona
Kayenta Formation